Communicator may refer to:

Computer science
 Acorn Communicator, a business computer developed by Acorn Computers in 1985
 Beonex Communicator, a separate branch of the Mozilla Application Suite
 Netscape Communicator, a suite of Internet applications
 Nokia Communicator, a brand name for a series of Nokia smartphones
 PDA with mobile phone functionality, also known as smartphone, such as Nokia Communicator mentioned above
 LIVECHAT Communicator, a business instant messenger software
 Microsoft Office Communicator, an instant messaging and VoIP client for Microsoft Windows

Fiction
 Communicator (Star Trek), a portable communication device from the Star Trek fictional universe
 Communicator, another term for universal translator, a fictional device that allows one to understand a language from another planet or an animal

See also
 Personal communicator
 The Communicator (disambiguation)